Mike Card (born February 18, 1986 in Kitchener, Ontario) is a professional ice hockey defenceman who currently plays for Löwen Frankfurt.  He played Junior A hockey in the BCHL at the age of 15 before 4 seasons with the Kelowna Rockets of the WHL, winning 2 WHL titles and the 2004 Memorial Cup.  Card signed a contract with the Buffalo Sabres, NHL in 2006 and played 4 games that season. He spent 3 seasons in the AHL, missing extended time due to concussion problems.  Card has played the last 8 seasons in Europe, mostly Germany, recently winning a championship with Löwen Frankfurt.

Playing career
Card was drafted in the eighth round, 241st overall, by the Buffalo Sabres in the 2004 NHL Entry Draft. After moving from Kitchener, Ontario to Penticton, British Columbia in his youth he played in the Western Hockey League with the Kelowna Rockets After playing four seasons with the Rockets, winning one Memorial Cup, Card made his professional debut with the Sabres' American Hockey League affiliate, the Rochester Americans, in the 2006–07 season.  He played in four NHL games with the Sabres during the same season.

Released as a free agent after his contract expired with the Sabres, Card left for Germany, signing a contract with the Kassel Huskies of the DEL to score 25 points in 53 games. Card signed a two-year contract with Kölner Haie on July 17, 2010.

Career statistics

References

External links

Q&A with Mike Card - Hockey's Future

1986 births
Living people
Buffalo Sabres draft picks
Buffalo Sabres players
Canadian ice hockey defencemen
Florida Everblades players
Ice hockey people from Ontario
Löwen Frankfurt players
Kassel Huskies players
Kelowna Rockets players
Kölner Haie players
Portland Pirates players
Rochester Americans players
Sportspeople from Kitchener, Ontario
Canadian expatriate ice hockey players in Germany